Manuel Santana Martínez (10 May 1938 – 11 December 2021), also known as Manolo Santana, was a Spanish tennis player. He was ranked as amateur world No. 1 in 1965 by Ned Potter and in 1966 by Lance Tingay and Sport In The USSR.

He won the US Open in 1965 and, before winning Wimbledon the following year, he was quoted as saying "grass is just for cows", favouring artificial surfaces.

Career
Santana was born in Madrid, and began his career as a ball boy and "picked up" the game. Santana took up tennis by chance after bringing a meal to his brother, who worked in a tennis club in Madrid. "I saw men in pants playing tennis. I was immediately charmed. I started as a ball boy, and then I started playing. In the end, I am an example of humility in an elitist world," he told newspaper El Español.

In 1965, Santana led Spain to unexpected victory over the U.S. in the Davis Cup, and he became a national hero. Despite his previous Grand Slam successes in the French Championships (1961, 1964) and the U.S. Championships (1965), Santana's win at the 1966 Wimbledon lawn tennis championships was a surprise, where he defeated the sixth seed Dennis Ralston in three straight sets. He also managed to attain the world number 1 ranking in 1965. His last big tournament win was in 1970 by winning Barcelona where he defeated Rod Laver. He also captured the doubles title in Barcelona that year when he teamed with Lew Hoad to defeat Laver/Andrés Gimeno.

Santana was named to the International Tennis Hall of Fame in 1984.

At the 1968 Olympic Games in Mexico City, Santana won the gold medal in singles, but tennis was only a demonstration sport at that time. It became a medal sport in 1988 (after another demonstration event in 1984).

Santana later was captain of the Spanish Davis Cup team twice, once in the 1980s and again for four and a half years in the mid-1990s, until he was dismissed in 1999. Until 2019, he was the organizer of the Madrid Masters.

Santana managed the Manolo Santana Racquets Club, a tennis club in Marbella, Spain and the Sport Center Manolo Santana, in Madrid.

Santana and Lleyton Hewitt are the only Wimbledon men's singles champions to lose in the first round in the following year; Hewitt's loss was to Ivo Karlović in 2003 during the Open era, while Santana's was to Puerto Rico and U.S. No. 1 Charlie Pasarell in 1967 in the last year before the Open era.

Santana appeared at the 2011 Wimbledon Championships in London in the Royal Box to watch the men's final, which was between his fellow countryman Rafael Nadal and Novak Djokovic (who had become world No. 1 after winning his semifinal match against Jo-Wilfried Tsonga).

In 2020, Santana was awarded the ITF Philippe Chatrier Award for his contribution to tennis, both on and off the court.

Grand Slam performance timeline

Grand Slam finals

Singles (4 titles)
Source:

Doubles (1 title)
Source:

Career finals

Singles titles (94)
(Incomplete roll)

Personal life
Santana was born in 1938, the son of a father imprisoned for his political beliefs during the early years of the Franco dictatorship. Santana married María Fernanda González-Dopeso in 1963; they had three children (Manuel, Beatriz and Borja). Their marriage ended in 1980. He also had a daughter outside his marriage, Barbara. In 1983, he married reporter Mila Ximénez, with whom he had a daughter, Alba. The divorce, in 1986, was unamicable. He also married (1990) and divorced (2008) Otti Glanzelius. He married Claudia Ines Rodriguez in 2013. The couple married in a private ceremony at the home of friends in Marbella.

Death
Santana died on 11 December 2021, at the age of 83. The Madrid Open announced his death but not the cause.

Rafael Nadal reacted to his death by posting on Twitter, "the only other Spanish man to win Wimbledon. We will miss you. Thank you a thousand times for what you have done for our country and for having opened the way for so many people. You have always been a point of reference, a friend and a person very close to everyone." Spanish King Felipe VI also reacted by posting on Twitter, "there are people who become legends and make a country great. Manolo Santana was and will always be one of them." Spanish Prime Minister Pedro Sánchez lamented the loss of a "legend". He tweeted, "my condolences to Manolo Santana's family, his loved ones and the tennis world."

Citations

General sources 
 Robertson, Max (ed.). Advisory editor: Kramer, Jack (1974). The Encyclopedia of Tennis. New York: Viking Press. .

External links
 
 
 
 
 Manolo Santana Racquets club
 Sport Center Manolo Santana

1938 births
2021 deaths
Competitors at the 1963 Mediterranean Games
Competitors at the 1967 Mediterranean Games
French Championships (tennis) champions
Grand Slam (tennis) champions in men's doubles
Grand Slam (tennis) champions in men's singles
International Tennis Hall of Fame inductees
Mediterranean Games bronze medalists for Spain
Mediterranean Games gold medalists for Spain
Mediterranean Games medalists in tennis
Mediterranean Games silver medalists for Spain
Spanish male tennis players
Tennis players at the 1968 Summer Olympics
Tennis players from Madrid
United States National champions (tennis)
Wimbledon champions (pre-Open Era)
World number 1 ranked male tennis players